The 1969 All-Atlantic Coast Conference football team consists of American football players chosen by various selectors for their All-Atlantic Coast Conference ("ACC") teams for the 1969 NCAA University Division football season. Selectors in 1969 included the Associated Press (AP).

All-Atlantic Coast Conference selections

Offensive selections

Ends
 Charlie Waters, Clemson (AP)
 Fred Zeigler, South Carolina (AP)

Offensive tackles
 Dave DeCamilla, South Carolina (AP)
 Ralph Sonntag, Maryland (AP)

Offensive guards
 Ed Chalupka, North Carolina (AP)
 Don Jordan, NC State (AP)

Centers
 Joe Dobner, Wake Forest (AP)

Backs
 Leo Hart, Duke (AP)
 Don McCauley, North Carolina (AP)
 Ray Yauger, Clemson (AP)
 Warren Muir, South Carolina (AP)

Defensive selections

Defensive ends
 Judge Mattocks, North Carolina (AP)
 Ivan Southerland, Clemson (AP)

Defensive tackles
 Ron Carpenter, NC State (AP)
 Jimmy Poston, South Carolina (AP)

Middle guards

Linebackers
 Bill Richardson, North Carolina (AP)
 John Mazalewski, Wake Forest (AP)
 Mike Hilka, NC State (AP)

Defensive backs
 Pat Watson, South Carolina (AP)
 Jack Whitley, NC State (AP)
 Rick Searl, Duke (AP)
 Gary Young, NC State (AP)

Special teams

Kickers
 Billy Dupre, South Carolina (AP)

Key
AP = Associated Press

See also
1969 College Football All-America Team

References

All-Atlantic Coast Conference football team
All-Atlantic Coast Conference football teams